Cathaiaphaenops is a genus of beetles in the family Carabidae, containing the following species:

 Cathaiaphaenops amplipennis Ueno, 2000
 Cathaiaphaenops chuandongziensis Deuve, 2000
 Cathaiaphaenops delprati Deuve, 1996
 Cathaiaphaenops draconis Deuve, 2000
 Cathaiaphaenops lynchae Deuve & Tian, 2008
 Cathaiaphaenops vignatagliantii Deuve, 2000

References

Trechinae